The Waterford County Board of the Gaelic Athletic Association (GAA) or Waterford GAA is one of the 32 county boards of the GAA in Ireland, and is responsible for all levels of Gaelic games in County Waterford. The County Board is also responsible for the Waterford county teams. The county board's offices are based at Walsh Park in the city of Waterford. The Waterford County Board was founded in 1886.

Hurling is the dominant sport, with the county having won the All-Ireland Senior Hurling Championship (SHC) on two occasions: in 1948 and 1959. While football is the secondary sport in the county, it is widely played nonetheless. Waterford's greatest footballing achievement was reaching the 1898 All-Ireland Senior Football Championship Final, which the team lost to Dublin.

Governance
Founded in 1886, the Waterford GAA board administers Gaelic games at all levels in County Waterford. This includes the sports of hurling, football, handball and rounders. The board officiates over both senior and underage competitions and both championship and league competitions in the county. The board is also responsible for both hurling and football county teams. The county is known prominently as The Déise, after the name of an ancient Irish kingdom which covered a vast part of modern County Waterford.

Colours and crest

Waterford's present colours are white and blue.  Both county teams play in white shirts, with blue trim along with blue shorts and blue socks. Prior to 2002, the county wore white shorts. Waterford is one of only three counties whose uniforms are not manufactured by O'Neills; instead, they are made by Waterford-based Azzurri Sportswear (O'Neills did manufacture Waterford's jerseys up until 2002). Waterford hurling and football are presently sponsored by TQS Integration, and have been since 2017.

While the current jersey is white with blue trim, Waterford's original jersey was royal blue and white, with white shorts and blue socks. The change to the current jersey was made in 1936. Today, Waterford uses a blue jersey as its second jersey in case of a clash of colours.

The present crest was introduced in 2009 and features three Viking longboats from the crest of the city of Waterford, and a representation of the round tower in Ardmore. The crest introduced in 2009 was a further refinement of a crest introduced in 2003. The new crest replaced the original crest of the city of Waterford. The new crest was introduced as the Waterford GAA board were unable to copyright the old one due to it being a civil crest.

Hurling

Clubs

Clubs contest the Waterford Senior Hurling Championship. That competition's most successful club is Mount Sion, with 35 titles.

Other competitions include:
 Waterford Intermediate Hurling Championship
 Waterford Junior Hurling Championship
 Waterford Under-21 Hurling Championship
 Waterford Minor Hurling Championship

1981–82 All-Ireland Senior Club Hurling Championship: Mount Sion would win the county's first Munster club title, defeating South Liberties of Limerick in the final. James Stephens of Kilkenny would defeat Mount Sion by 3-13 (22) to 3-8 (17) in the All-Ireland final.

County team

The Waterford County Board was established in 1886 in Kilmacthomas and played in the Munster Championship for the first time in 1888, losing to Cork on a score of 2–8 to 0-0. The next fourteen years would consist of walkovers, first round defeats and not entering the competition at all. Waterford would finally win a championship match for the first time in 1903, defeating Kerry by 5–6 to 2–9. In their first Munster final, which did not take place until 1904, Waterford would lose to Cork. Waterford would not win another senior championship match until 1925 when Clare were defeated, only for Tipperary to beat them in only their second Munster final. Despite its present reputation as a hurling stronghold, football was initially the preferred Gaelic sport in Waterford: the county was one of only nine to compete in the inaugural All-Ireland football championship in 1887. It would be the last of the Munster counties to win a provincial or All-Ireland SHC title.

An 11-point win over Cork in the 1938 Munster semi-final saw Waterford into their seventh Munster final, where they defeated Clare by 3–5 to 2–5. They reached the county's first ever All-Ireland final after an easy win over Galway, where they lost to Dublin in Croke Park by 2-5 (11) to 1-6 (9). The following year, Waterford played in their first National Hurling League final, losing to Dublin by 1-8 (11) to 1-4 (7). If Limerick had proven to be Waterford's nemesis in the 1930s, defeating Waterford again in 1940 on their way to another All-Ireland, the 1940s belonged to Cork who would win the All-Ireland four years running from 1941 to 1944 and again in 1946, defeating Waterford in 1943, 1946 and 1947. By 1948 though, Waterford's time had finally come. Defeating Clare by two points in the Munster semi-final, the margin was even narrower in the Munster final against Cork, Waterford prevailing by a score of 4-7 (19) to 3-9 (18). Galway were overcome in the All-Ireland semi-final, and Dublin – containing RTÉ broadcaster Seán Óg Ó Ceallacháin in the half-forward line – were well beaten, on a score of 6-7 (25) to 4-2 (14). Waterford had won the Liam MacCarthy Cup at last. To add to the joy of 1948, the Minor team would win the county's second Munster and All-Ireland titles, defeating Tipperary (3-6 to 0–3) and Kilkenny (3-8 to 4–2) respectively. Limerick relieved Waterford of their titles in the first defence in 1949, defeating them by five points in the Munster semi-final. Waterford would not reach another Munster final until 1957. 1958 was the first year Waterford won through to the Munster final having won it the previous year, a win over Kerry setting up the shot at a repeat victory. However, Tipperary were convincing winners on a score of 4-12 (24) to 1-5 (8). Tipperary would also defeat Waterford in the county's second National Hurling League final appearance in 1959 by seven points. Galway were the first opponents in that year's Munster championship, and the Tribesmen were well beaten, 7-11 (32) to 0–8. Tipperary were waiting in the semi-final, where they choose to play against a stiff first-half breeze. Waterford took full advantage of this, scoring 8–2 in the first half without reply, and eventually winning 9-3 (30) to 3-4 (13). The county's fourth Munster title was secured with a three-point win over Cork in Thurles. In the All-Ireland final, Kilkenny would make life difficult for Waterford with a string of goals, and with minutes remaining Waterford found themselves in the incredible position of having outscored Kilkenny by seven yet still being three points behind. But Seamus Power's late goal ensured a draw, 1–17 to 5-5. Waterford did not repeat those mistakes in the replay, securing the county's second All-Ireland title, 3-12 (21) to 1-10 (13). The 1963 League final against Tipperary had Waterford win an eventful match by 2-15 (21) to 4–7 – the 'Home' final as the winners were due to meet New York for the title proper. There was to be no such free-scoring the 1963 Munster final though (reached after a six-point in over Limerick in the semi-final), Waterford edging a tense affair by 0–11 to 0–8, a result that would be Tipperary's only senior championship defeat between 1961 and 1965, effectively denying them a 'five-in-a-row'. In the All-Ireland final, Kilkenny were inspired by a 14-point haul from Eddie Keher to a 4-17 (29) to 6-8 (26) victory. There was some consolation for Waterford in the National Hurling League final 'proper', where after a scare in a drawn first game (3-6 to 3–6) Waterford won the replay against New York by 3-10 (19) to 1-10 (13).

Waterford would not win another senior title for nearly fifty years. 1974 brought the county's first All Star award, won by John Galvin. But a Cork team about to embark on a three-in-a-row of All-Ireland success hammered Waterford by 22 points in the first round in 1975, and the only county Waterford would beat in the Munster championship over the following six years was Kerry. The only bright spot at senior inter-county level would be Mossy Walsh's All Star award in 1980. The Centenary year saw relegation to Division Two of the National Hurling League, a quarter-final defeat by Galway in the Centenary Cup and a one-point defeat by Clare in the Munster championship. Waterford would have to wait until 1989 to win another championship match, a period which would see them relegated to Division Three of the National Hurling League. Waterford would return immediately to Division Two and reach successive League semi-finals in 1987 and 1988, where they were heavily defeated by Galway and Tipperary respectively. In the first round of the Munster championship in 1993, Kerry won in Walsh Park by 4-13 (25) to 3-13 (22), the Kingdom's first senior hurling championship win since 1926.

The appointment of former Cork All-Ireland winning trainer Gerald McCarthy as Waterford manager was seen as a statement of intent on the part of the County Board. A poor first half performance cost them dear in the first round against Limerick in 1997, but the introduction of the hurling 'back door' gave Waterford extra incentive to perform well in the 1998 championship, especially with a relatively kind draw in Munster. An excellent run in the National League saw Waterford reach their first final since 1963, laying the semi-final hoodoo with a five-point win over Limerick. A tight match in the final saw Cork pull away for a flattering win by  2-14 (20) to 0–13. The morale that had been raised on the back of that run in the League was nearly squandered as Waterford needed a late flurry of point to secure an even more flattering eight points win against Kerry. Despite this, confidence was high going into a semi-final that, due to the Munster finalists being guaranteed a place in the All-Ireland series, had an extra frisson of tension. The Waterford hurlers did not disappoint, securing a 0–21 to 2-12 (18) win over Tipperary. Waterford were back in the Munster final and heading for Croke Park. Tony Browne won his first All Star and also the Hurler of the Year award in 1998. But the Gerald McCarthy era, which had promised so much, ended in a cruel manner against Limerick in 2001. Waterford raced into a 2-6 (12) to 0–1 lead after 15 minutes, but Limerick hung in and scored three goals in the last ten minutes to break Waterford's resistance, winning in the end by 4-11 (23) to 2-14 (20).

It was with this unpromising setup that another former All-Ireland winner with Cork, Justin McCarthy became manager. An unremarkable League performance did not suggest Waterford were ready to topple Cork, but despite having a five-point second half lead eroded to nothing late in the game, Waterford held their nerve to score a late point from Ken McGrath and a 1-16 (19) to 1-15 (18) victory. The reigning Munster and All-Ireland champions Tipperary were warm favourites in the Munster final that followed. A spectacular display of shooting from Waterford gave the Déise a 2-23 (29) to 3-12 (21) victory that was more impressive than the final margin of eight points suggested. Waterford were confident of adding the All-Ireland crown to this first Munster title in 39 years. Despite a flying start in the semi-final against Clare, they eventually faded to lose by three points. The season was still a success from a Waterford perspective, and Fergal Hartley, Eoin Kelly and Ken McGrath were selected for All Star awards. Waterford began the defence of their sixth Munster title with an easy win over Kerry before meeting Limerick a match where, unusually among modern GAA championship matches, no cameras were present due to a fire safety issue at Thurles, thus ensuring only those who were there got to enjoy a thrilling tie, with Waterford as in 2001 racing into an early lead only to be hauled back by Limerick. The match ended level, 4-13 (25) each, but the televised replay was an anti-climax, with Waterford hanging on for a 1-13 (16) to 0–14 victory. The Munster final against Cork featured a hat-trick of goals from a player on the losing team, in this case John Mullane of Waterford. They had failed to make a first half breeze count and, despite the heroics from Mullane, Cork won by four points, 3-16 (25) to 3-12 (21). John Mullane's performance would be pivotal in him securing Waterford's sole All Star for the year, as the season petered out in the All-Ireland series with a disappointing 1-20 (23) to 0–18 defeat in Waterford's first ever championship match with Wexford. The 2004 National League saw Waterford reach their seventh final, secured by finishing top of a second phase of group games thanks to a late equalising point from Paul Flynn against Tipperary. There was more disappointment though as Galway were convincing 2-15 (21) to 1-13 (16) winners. To regain the Munster title, Waterford were going to have to do it the hard way by beating Clare and Tipperary just to reach the final. Waterford sensationally trounced the Banner County by 3-21 (30) to 1-8 (11), a performance illuminated by a hat-trick of goals from Dan Shanahan. The semi-final was a much tighter affair, with a late goal from sub Paul O'Brien needed to beat Tipperary by 4-10 (22) to 3-12 (21). The final against Cork was hailed to be one of the best Munster finals with a match that ebbed and flowed turned on an audacious dipping medium range free from Paul Flynn that surprised the Cork backs for a goal. Waterford secured their seventh Munster title with one point, 1-21 (24) to 3-16 (25), win. The All-Ireland semi-final saw another clash with Kilkenny and another three-point defeat, a first-half salvo of three goals giving Waterford a mountain that proved too difficult to climb. Gallingly for Waterford, Kilkenny had come through the All-Ireland series, and would lose out in the final to Cork who themselves had come through the 'back door'. Paul Flynn's tally of 0–13 against Kilkenny would copperfasten his first All Star award, with Dan Shanahan getting his first and Ken McGrath winning his second, only the second Waterford man after John Galvin to win multiple All Stars.

The 2007 season ended with a record five All Star awards, Tony Browne and Ken McGrath winning their third awards, Dan Shanahan his third also, and Stephen Molumphy and Michael Walsh their first. Shanahan was further rewarded by being named undisputed Hurler of the Year. A win against Wexford in 2008 led Waterford to their sixth All-Ireland Semi-Final since 1998. The opponents would be a highly fancied Tipperary, who were reigning National Hurling League and Munster champions. Waterford started a blistering page, going six points to nil up after only 10 minutes. However, Tipperary were level going in at half time. Both teams scored goals in rapid succession in the second half. Waterford's nerve held and they managed to win by two points on a scoreline of Waterford 1-20 Tipperary 1–18. It was Waterford's first semi-final win since 1963 and brought to an end a run of five consecutive semi-final defeats. They met an inspired Kilkenny team in the All-Ireland final, who ran out 3–30 to 1-13 winners, which saw them complete the three-in-a-row. The inter-county year ended with Eoin Kelly being named as the Déise's only all-star. Waterford defeated Clare in the 2010 Munster Semi-Final and won their ninth Munster title when they defeated Cork after extra time with a cracking goal from Dan Shanahan in a replay in Thurles. The All-Ireland semi-final saw them lose at that stage for the seventh time in thirteen years, beaten by seven points by Tipperary. In May 2015, Waterford in Derek McGrath's second year as manager won their first league title since 2007 after a 1–24 to 0–17 win against Cork in the final. Waterford beat Cork to make the Munster Final, but lost to Tipperary by five points. In 2017, Waterford suffered defeat in the All Ireland Senior Hurling Championship against Galway with a final score of 0–26 to 2–17.

Football

Clubs

 Waterford Senior Football Championship: The current senior football champions are Rathgormack who defeated Ballinacourty in the 2019 final on an underwhelming scoreline of 2–06 to 1–06 with William Hahessy receiving the man of the match award. Ballinacourty struggled to cope with the lightning pace of the young Rathgormack side.
 Waterford Minor Football Championship
 Waterford Under-21 Football Championship
 Waterford Intermediate Football Championship
 Waterford Junior Football Championship

County team

The team's greatest achievement is reaching the 1898 All-Ireland Senior Football Championship Final, a game which was lost to Dublin by a scoreline of 2–08 to 0–04. Erin's Hope of Dungarvan represented the county in that game.

Waterford has not reached a Munster Senior Football Championship (SFC) final since 1960, has not defeated Kerry since 1957, Cork since 1960, Limerick since 1981 and Tipperary since 1988. On 20 May 2007, the team broke a 19-year run without a senior championship win by defeating Clare at Fraher Field, Dungarvan. The team defeated Clare again in 2010.

Camogie

Waterford hosted the All-Ireland Senior Camogie Championship final of 1945, at a time Cork were in dispute with the Central Council of the Camogie Association. They won the All-Ireland Junior Camogie Championship of 2011. Notable players include soaring star award winners Karen Kelly and Áine Lyng.

Under Camogie's National Development Plan 2010–2015, "Our Game, Our Passion," five new camogie clubs are to be established in the county by 2015.

Ladies' football
Waterford were dominant in the 1990s, winning the Brendan Martin Cup five times.

Waterford have the following achievements in ladies' football.

 All-Ireland Senior Ladies' Football Championship: 5
 1991, 1992, 1994, 1995, 1998
 All-Ireland Junior Ladies' Football Championship 1
 1986
 All-Ireland Under-18 Ladies' Football Championship: 5
 1991, 1993, 1996, 1997, 2001
 All-Ireland Under-16 Ladies' Football Championship: 5
 1991, 1992, 1995, 1996, 1998
  All-Ireland Under-14 Ladies' Football Championship: 1
 1998

References

Further reading
 A Story of Hurling in Waterford - compiled and written by Dickie Roche
 Working on a Dream - A Year in the Life of the Waterford Footballers - compiled and written by Damian Lawlor

External links

 Waterford GAA site
 Waterford on Hoganstand.com
 National and provincial titles won by Waterford teams
 Club championship winners
 www.UpTheDeise.com - Waterford GAA Fans Website
 Come on the Déise

 
Gaelic games governing bodies in Munster
Sport in County Waterford
Sports organizations established in 1886